Puerto Rico Highway 693 (PR-693) is a road located between the municipalities of Dorado, Puerto Rico and Vega Alta, passing through downtown Dorado. It begins at its intersection with PR-2 and PR-165 in Río Lajas and ends at PR-690 in Sabana. It is a short divided highway in southern Dorado, which serves as an alternate route for PR-165 west of Río de la Plata.

Major intersections

Related route

Puerto Rico Highway 6693 (PR-6693) is a spur of PR-693 located in Dorado. This road is a bypass located south of the downtown area and goes from PR-693 to PR-696.

See also

 List of highways numbered 693

References

External links

 PR-693, Dorado, Puerto Rico

693